Mário André Afonso Freitas (born 9 February 1990) is a Portuguese professional futsal player who plays for AD Fundão and the Portugal national team as a winger.

References

External links

1990 births
Living people
Portuguese men's futsal players
Sporting CP futsal players
S.L. Benfica futsal players